The Yunnan parrotbill (Sinosuthora ricketti) is a parrotbill in the Old World babbler family. This 10 cm long parrotbill is endemic to China, breeding in northwest Yunnan.

It was formerly considered conspecific with the brown-winged parrotbill, Sinosuthora brunnea, (sometimes the vinous-throated parrotbill, Sinosuthora webbiana), but more recent revisions have found it to be a distinct species. Its behaviour is described as similar to that of vinous-throated.

References

Robson, C. (2007). Family Paradoxornithidae (Parrotbills) pp. 292–321 in; del Hoyo, J., Elliott, A. & Christie, D.A. eds. Handbook of the Birds of the World, Vol. 12. Picathartes to Tits and Chickadees. Lynx Edicions, Barcelona.

Yunnan parrotbill
Yunnan parrotbill
Birds of Yunnan
Yunnan parrotbill